Glen Historic District is a national historic district located at Glen in Montgomery County, New York. It includes 52 contributing buildings and two contributing sites. The district encompasses the historic core of a rural crossroads hamlet.  The majority of the structures are one and one half or two story, timber-framed buildings with gable roofs.  At the crossroads are the most distinguished buildings: two large Federal style residences, a mid-19th century general store, and a distinguished, Second Empire style brick residence built in 1878.

It was listed on the National Register of Historic Places in 2001.

Gallery

References

External links

Historic districts on the National Register of Historic Places in New York (state)
Federal architecture in New York (state)
Buildings and structures in Montgomery County, New York
National Register of Historic Places in Montgomery County, New York